Hong Ihk-pyo (born 20 November 1967) is a South Korean academic and politician in the liberal Minjoo Party of Korea. Since 2012 he has been member of the National Assembly for Seongdong, Seoul. He is considered a member of the party's pro–Roh Moo-hyun faction.

Hong attracted attention in July 2013 as a spokesman for the Minjoo Party's predecessor, the Democratic Party, when he described President Park Geun-hye as a gwitae (鬼胎), literally a "baby born to a ghost or the Devil" or "ghost fetus or demon fetus", an uncommon term that has been applied in an abstract sense to Japanese militarism. A presidential spokesman stated that the label was "verbal abuse and a slur" and questioned Hong's "qualification as a lawmaker". Hong was forced to resign as party spokesman following the remark.

Before becoming a National Assembly member, Hong was a professor at the University of North Korean Studies. He previously worked as an advisor in the Korea Institute for International Economic Policy, and later in the Economic Research Institute for Northeast Asia from 2005 to 2006 in Japan and as senior policy advisor in the Ministry of Unification from 2007 to 2008.

Works
 1998: (with Cho Myung-chul) 
 2000: (with Cho Myung-chul) 
 2002: 
 2011: (with others) 
 2014:

References

1967 births
Hanyang University alumni
Living people
Members of the National Assembly (South Korea)
Minjoo Party of Korea politicians
South Korean political scientists